Tom Orr (August 27, 1877 – December 11, 1954) was an American racecar driver from Chicago, Illinois. He competed in the AAA Championship Car series in 1914 and 1915 making five starts including the 1915 Indianapolis 500. All of his race starts were behind the wheel of a Maxwell for whom he was an engineer. He served in World War I and later moved to Denver, Colorado where he died in 1954.

Indy 500 results

References

External links
Tom Orr at Champ Car Stats

1877 births
1954 deaths
Indianapolis 500 drivers
Racing drivers from Chicago